The 1st Louisiana Regiment Infantry was a regiment in the Union Army during the American Civil War.

Service
The unit was organized at New Orleans, Louisiana, on  July 30, 1862, and remained on duty there until January, 1863. They then moved to Baton Rouge where they remained until March, after which they participated in operations against Port Hudson, and in the Siege of Port Hudson culminating in the surrender on  July 9, 1863.

The regiment participated in the Red River Campaign from March to May, 1864.

The unit mustered out on July 12, 1865.

See also
List of Louisiana Union Civil War units

References

External links

Louisiana Regiment Infantry, 001
Military units and formations established in 1862
1862 establishments in Louisiana
Military units and formations disestablished in 1865